Scilla hyacinthoides is a geophyte, native to the Middle East, though it was also brought to France by the Turks. Currently this plant is in the process of domestication as a cut flower in Israel due to its inflorescences.

Scilla hyacinthoides is a bulb plant. It flowers in March to April with bluish-purple flowers on 50–80 cm high flowering stalks.

Sources 
 The Jerusalem Botanical Gardens site
 Michael Zohary; Naomi Feinbrun-Dothan (1966-1986) Flora Palaestina
 Witztum A.and Negbi M. (1991) Primary xylem of Scilla hyacinthoides (Liliaceae) - the wool-bearing bulb of Theophrastus. Economical Botany 45:97-102

Hyacinthoides
Plants described in 1767